Robertson Drive, also known as the Bunbury Bypass, Bunbury Ring Road, or Bunbury Inner Ring Road, is a  road in Bunbury, Western Australia. It forms a partial ring road around Bunbury, allowing highway traffic to bypass the city centre. The road connects four highway routes that radiate out Bunbury: Forrest Highway to the north, South Western Highway north-eastbound and south-east bound, and Bussell Highway to the south. A dual carriageway along the route was completed in 1992.

Route description 
The northern terminus of the highway is at the Eelup Roundabout, a large, traffic light controlled roundabout that distributes traffic to Koombana Drive, Sandridge Road, Robertson Drive and Forrest Highway. Traffic coming from Forrest Highway has a slip lane that allows free flowing of traffic onto Robertson Drive, whereas the southbound Forrest Highway traffic must proceed through 2 sets of traffic lights. After the roundabout, the road continues south as an  zone. There is a traffic light controlled intersection with Picton Road and South Western Highway (northern section, which proceeds as State Route 20), from which the road becomes a  zone. The road crosses over the Australind railway line and then descends into the Bunbury Industrial Area, with a major traffic light controlled intersection with South Western Highway (southern section, which proceeds as National Route 1) and Brittain Road. The road continues south, now an  zone, followed by a sharp turn towards the west, meeting an intersection with Sommerville Drive. Following the Sommerville intersection, there is access provided to TAFE, the ECU campus and the hospitals. The roads southern terminus is with Bussell Highway at a roundabout with Bussell Highway gaining the State Route 10 marker in the southerly direction.

Internal designations 
Robertson Drive is controlled by Main Roads Western Australia, which internally designates it as Highway H57 Forrest Highway (north of South Western Highway), H9 South Western Highway (for the central section), and H43 Bussell Highway (south of South Western Highway).

See also
Bunbury Outer Ring Road

References

Roads in Western Australia
Bunbury, Western Australia
Highway 1 (Australia)